This is the results breakdown of the local elections held in Castile and León on 24 May 2015. The following tables show detailed results in the autonomous community's most populous municipalities, sorted alphabetically.

Opinion polls

City control
The following table lists party control in the most populous municipalities, including provincial capitals (shown in bold). Gains for a party are displayed with the cell's background shaded in that party's colour.

Municipalities

Ávila
Population: 58,933

Burgos
Population: 177,776

León
Population: 129,551

Palencia
Population: 80,178

Ponferrada
Population: 67,367

Salamanca
Population: 148,042

Segovia
Population: 53,260

Soria
Population: 39,516

Valladolid
Population: 306,830

Zamora
Population: 64,423

See also
2015 Castilian-Leonese regional election

References

Castile and León
2015